Twice Upon a Hell of a Time is the seventh studio album by Matt Mays, released on October 19, 2018. It comprises acoustic rerecordings of the songs from his 2017 album Once Upon a Hell of a Time.

Track listing

All songs written by Matt Mays, except as noted.

References

External links
 Official Matt Mays Website

2018 albums
Matt Mays albums